USS C-3 (SS-14) was one of five C-class submarines built for the United States Navy in the first decade of the 20th century.

Description
The C-class submarines were enlarged versions of the preceding B class, the first American submarines with two propeller shafts. They displaced  on the surface and  submerged. The C-class boats had a crew of 1 officer and 14 enlisted men.

For surface running, they were powered by two  Craig gasoline engines, each driving one propeller shaft. When submerged each propeller was driven by a  electric motor. They could reach  on the surface and  underwater.

The boats were armed with two 18-inch (450 mm) torpedo tubes in the bow. They carried two reloads, for a total of four torpedoes.

Construction and career

C-3 was laid down by Fore River Shipbuilding in Quincy, Massachusetts, under a subcontract from Electric Boat Company, as Tarpon. She was launched on 8 April 1909 as Tarpon sponsored by Katherine E. Theiss, and commissioned on 23 November 1909. She was renamed C-3 on 17 November 1911. The boat cruised along the east coast with the Atlantic Torpedo Fleet and the Atlantic Submarine Flotilla through the early 1913, operating in tests and exercises. From May to December 1913, she was based at Guantanamo Bay, Cuba, and on 12 December reported at Cristóbal, Panama Canal Zone. Her operations included exploration of anchorages, tactical drills, and harbor defense patrol at Canal Zone ports. In the summer of 1918, she patrolled off Florida, then returned to Panamanian waters. C-3 was placed in ordinary at Coco Solo, Canal Zone, on 22 August 1919, decommissioned there on 23 December 1919, and sold on 12 April 1920.

Notes

References

External links

United States C-class submarines
World War I submarines of the United States
Ships built in Quincy, Massachusetts
1909 ships